
The 2012 Sunderland Council election took place on 3 May 2012 to elect members of Sunderland City Council in England. It was held on the same day as other 2012 United Kingdom local elections.

Election results 
Following the election, the Labour Party remained in control of the council with its majority increased by eight. Labour took seats from the Conservatives in Washington East, Washington South, St Peter's, St Chad's, Ryhope, Doxford and Barnes. The Liberal Democrats also lost out to Labour in Millfield.

The Conservatives held two wards – Fulwell and St Michael's. Independents in Copt Hill and Houghton also held their seats.

This resulted in the following composition of the council:

Ward by ward results
An asterisk denotes an incumbent.

Barnes ward

Castle ward

Copt Hill ward

†Swing to the Independent candidate from the Conservatives, who had stood last time this seat was contested.

Doxford ward

Fulwell ward

Hendon ward

Hetton ward

Houghton ward

†Swing to the Independent candidate from the Conservatives, who had stood last time this seat was contested.

Millfield ward

Pallion ward

Redhill ward

†Swing to Labour from the BNP, who had stood last time this seat was contested.

Ryhope ward

St Anne's ward

St Chad's ward

St Michael's ward

St Peter's ward

Sandhill ward

There was a double vacancy in Sandhill ward in 2012, due to the retirement of Labour councillor Jim Scott, and the death of Labour councillor John Gallagher. Two seats were up for election, and each voter could cast two votes.

Shiney Row ward

Silksworth ward

Southwick ward

Washington Central ward

Washington East ward

Washington North ward

Washington South ward

Washington West ward

References

2012 English local elections
2012
21st century in Tyne and Wear